New Zealand provides student loans and allowances to tertiary students who satisfy the funding criteria. Full-time students can claim loans for both fees and living costs while part-time students can only claim training institution fees.

A non-refundable means-tested student allowance for living expenses can be claimed by students who are over 24 years old or whose parents have a low income. This criterion has caused anger among student bodies who point out that it excludes many self-sufficient adults from help due to parental income levels, and also that by age 24 most people have completed tertiary education.

Loan composition
The student loan comprises three parts:
Compulsory fees – covers tuition fees and various levies. These are paid to the tertiary institution directly.
Course-related costs – covers stationery, textbooks, equipment, etc. and voluntary student association fees. The borrower is allowed up to $1000 per year in course-related fees, which they can claim over the year. These are paid into the borrower's bank account.
Living costs – covers rent, food, services, etc. The maximum payment for living costs is $239.76 per week, plus any student allowance received. This figure is adjusted every year in April to account for inflation.

New loans
There is a debt eligibility check for new loan applications. It is not possible  to borrow through the Student Loan Scheme if you have $500 or more in default at the time of your application, and at least some portion of that amount has been overdue for a year or more. This applies to all new student loan applications received by StudyLink on or after 7 February 2013 and includes all unpaid repayment obligations, late payment interest, penalties and amounts under installment arrangement.

Repayment
While the borrower is a resident of New Zealand, loans are repaid at a rate of 12 cents for every whole dollar of taxable income earned over the repayment threshold ($21,268 per annum or $409 per week, for the 2023 tax year), and no interest is charged. In New Zealand income tax is automatically deducted from salary and wage payments, and student loan payments are deducted together with the tax payment.

Loan recipients who leave New Zealand accumulate interest after 184 days (about 6 months) abroad, and are assessed on their loan balance for repayment purposes, with a minimum annual payment being required. Loan repayments can be suspended on request for those on no/low income overseas, however interest still accumulates.

For borrowers in New Zealand with more than one job, it is possible to apply for a student loan special deduction rate for secondary earnings if you earn less than the pay period repayment threshold from your main job.

Student loans are written off in the event of the borrower dying; their estate is only obliged to pay any outstanding loan repayments up to the date of the borrower's death.

History
The loan system has been changed and modified significantly since its inception in 1992. Initially it provided bulk payments to students and charged lower than market interest rates from initial drawdown. This led some students to use this money for investment purposes, benefiting them but leading to a widespread perception of student excesses.

Changes under the Labour Government
In 2001 a growing debt mountain caused the Fifth Labour Government to stop interest payments while students studied. Then in 2005 they rode to election on the promise of stopping interest for all those remaining in New Zealand.

From 2001, all full-time students were made exempt from interest while studying, and from 2006 all borrowers resident in New Zealand have been exempted from interest. (Technically interest is applied to all loans, but written off if the borrower is resident in New Zealand.)

On 22 March 2007, the Government introduced a three-year 'loan repayment holiday' for those overseas. In practice this is a uniform extension of the previous ability to waive repayments until a later date. As before, interest accumulates during this period.

Changes under the National Government
The National Party initially opposed the interest free loans policy, but after it lost the 2005 election, in early 2008 said it would keep interest off student loans. After it was elected to government in the 2008 general election, the Fifth National Government has kept interest off student loans, but has introduced a number of changes designed to make students repay their loans faster, and introduced penalties for loan defaulters.

From 1 April 2009, voluntary student loan repayments above $500 in a tax year were awarded at 10% bonus.

In an effort to increase the repayment rate of borrowers, information sharing between Government departments was introduced in 2010.

From 1 April 2012, the maximum time for a repayment holiday was reduced from 3 years to 1 year.

From 1 April 2012, access to student loans was cut for people over 55. Also, an annual loan administration fee of $40 is charged.

From 1 April 2013, the repayment rate for student loan deductions increased from 10% to 12% and the voluntary repayment bonus was abolished. (Student allowances were also restricted to four years worth of study.) The changes which came into effect in 2013 were introduced because the Government said it wanted to shift its investment from student support to supporting universities. Changes also raised the minimum mandatory repayments for people earning more than $367 a week. The University Students Association criticised the changes, saying people choosing to pay back loans quickly would no longer be rewarded, and repayment thresholds were too low, at about 34% below the median weekly income.

The changes were criticised by Labour Party Tertiary Education Spokesperson, Grant Robertson, who said they would "dampen demand" for tertiary education and drive graduates overseas.

In 2013, the Government announced that the student loan defaulters could be arrested at New Zealand's border. It was an effort to recover $430 million of defaulted student loan debt, "80 per cent of which is owed by overseas borrowers". The move was criticised by NZUSA, who said the policy would be ineffectual, and could potentially create "student loan refugees" .

Student debt levels
Average student loan balances have increased substantially over time. For instance, a 2007 survey by the New Zealand Union of Students' Associations found that the average student debt was over NZ$28,000, up 54% from 2004. (For comparison, the average annual income (before tax) of New Zealanders aged 15 or more was nearly NZ$35,000.)

The total student debt reached $5 billion in 2002 and then $10 billion in 2008, and has been growing by approximately $1 billion annually. As of December 2014 student loan debt was $14.2 billion. While student debt has increased, the number of students enrolled in tertiary education has generally declined in recent years. In January 2017 it was estimated 731,800 people, with an average balance of $21,000 had outstanding student loans representing a total of $15.3 billion.

See also
Tertiary education in New Zealand
Student loans in Australia (HELP loans)

References

External links
Inland Revenue Student Loan Information

Education in New Zealand
New Zealand